Grenadier Guards ( foaled 4 February 2018) is a Japanese Thoroughbred racehorse. He was one of the best two-year-olds in Japan in 2020 when he won two of his four races including the Asahi Hai Futurity Stakes.

Background
Grenadier Guards is a bay colt bred in Japan by Northern Farm. He was sent into training with Mitsumasa Nakauchida and carries the black, red and yellow colours of Sunday Racing.

He was from the fifth crop of foals sired by Frankel, an undefeated racehorse whose other progeny have included Cracksman, Anapurna, Soul Stirring and Without Parole. Grenadier Guards' is the first foal of his dam Wavell Avenue, an Ontario-bred sprinter who won the Breeders' Cup Filly & Mare Sprint as a four-year-old in 2015. She was a female-line descendant of the Kentucky-bred broodmare Milonga (foaled in 1961) making her a distant relative of Go And Go, Media Puzzle and Refuse To Bend.

Racing career

2020: two-year-old season
Grenadier Guards was ridden in all of his starts as a two-year-old by Yuga Kawada. The colt began his racing career on 26 July when he finished second to the filly Salvia in a newcomers' race over 1400 metres at Niigata Racecourse, beaten half a length by the winner. In September he started the 1.6/1 second favourite for a maiden race over 1600 metres at Chukyo Racecourse but came home fourth of the ten runners behind Red Belle Aube. The colt's assistant trainer Yuya Katayama later said that the colt "didn't quite find a good enough rhythm" in the race. Grenadier Guards started favourite for a seventeen-runner maiden over 1400 metres at Hanshin Racecourse on 7 November and recorded his first success as he took the lead in the straight and drew away to win by three lengths from the front-running outsider Lord Respect.

Despite his modest form, Grenadier Guards was stepped up to Grade 1 level on 20 December at Hanshin to contest the Asahi Hai Futurity Stakes over 1600 metres and went off a 16.5/1 outsider. Red Belle Aube, who had gone on from his maiden win to take the Daily Hai Nisai Stakes started favourite while the other fourteen runners included Shock Action (Niigata Nisai Stakes), Mondreise (Keio Hai Nisai Stakes) and Stella Veloce (Saudi Arabia Royal Cup). Racing in blinkers Grenadier Guards started well and settled in second place behind Mondreise, who opened up a big lead before fading in the straight. Grenadier Guards went to the front 200 metres from the finish and held off the late challenge of Stella Veloce to win by three quarters of a length. The winning time of 1:32.3 was a new track record. After the race, Yuga Kawada said: "my concern was to keep him happy and in good rhythm because the colt has a difficult temper and can run off like he did in his second career outing so you have to be careful to keep him controlled, but he has great potentials if he can bring out his best and I am looking forward for another good season for him next year".

In the official Japanese rankings Grenadier Guards was rated the second best two-year-old colt of 2020, one pound behind Danon The Kid.

2021: three-year-old season
On his first appearance as a three-year-old Grenadier Guards started favourite for the Grade 3 Falcon Stakes over 1400 metres at Chukyo on 20 March but was beaten a head into second place by Rook's Nest. On 9 May Grenadier Guards contested the 26th edition of the Grade 1 NHK Mile Cup over 1600 metres at Tokyo Racecourse and started the 2.4/1 favourite. After settling in sixth place he was switched to the outside and made progress in the straight but was outpaced in the closing stages and came home third behind Schnell Meister and Songline.

Following a summer break, Grenadier Guards returned to the track for the Grade 3 Keisei Hai Autumn Handicap over 1600 metres at Nakayama Racecourse on 12 September when he was matched against older horses for the first time. He started favourite again but finished third behind the five-year-olds Catedral and Contra Check. He was moved back up to Grade 1 class for the Mile Championship ay Hanshin on 21 November when he ran unplaced behind Gran Alegria.

Pedigree

References

2018 racehorse births
Racehorses bred in Japan
Racehorses trained in Japan
Thoroughbred family 10-a